Amphidamas[pronunciation?] (Greek: Ἀμφιδάμας) was the name of an historical king of Chalcis, who died about 730 BC after the Lelantine War; whose burial ceremony being associated with the poetic agon is mentioned by Hesiod.

References

People from Chalcis
8th-century BC Greek people